Ferdinand Le Drogo (10 October 1903 – 24 April 1976) was a French professional road bicycle racer. He is most known for his silver medal in the Elite race of the 1931 Road World Championships. Ferdinand Le Drogo was the older brother of cyclist Paul Le Drogo.

In the 1927 Tour de France, Le Drogo took part in the Dilecta-Wolber team, which won the first stage, led by Francis Pélissier, who was the first leader of the general classification.
Le Drogo won the fifth stage. In the sixth stage, Francis Pélissier abandoned sick. Ferdinand Le Drogo, who was second in the general classification, became the new leader.
In the seventh stage, while Le Drogo was in the yellow jersey, the Tour passed in the region where he was born. His supporters cheered for Le Drogo, and he got excited and sped away from his teammates. That cost him too much energy, and he lost 20 minutes in that stage to the J.B. Louvet team, so the lead was transferred to Hector Martin, from the J.B. Louvet team. Le Drogo would never lead the Tour de France again.

Major results

1926
 1st, Tour des Cornouaillies
 1st, Nantes-Les Sables de l'Olonne
 1st, Circuit des As de l'Ouest
 3rd, National Road Race Championship
 3rd, GP Wolber
1927
  Road Race Champion
 1st, Stage 5, Tour de France
 1st, Stages 2 & 6, Volta a Catalunya
 6th, Paris–Tours
 7th, Bordeaux–Paris
1928
  Road Race Champion
 8th, World Road Race Championship
1929
 7th, World Road Race Championship
 7th, Paris–Tours
1930
 1st, GP Poitiers
 3rd, National Road Race Championship
1931
 1st, Rennes-Paris-Rennes
 1st, Circuit de l'Aulne
  World Road Race Championship
1932
 1st, Circuit de l'Aulne
 7th, Bordeaux–Paris

References

External links
 

1903 births
1976 deaths
People from Pontivy
French Tour de France stage winners
French male cyclists
Sportspeople from Morbihan
Cyclists from Brittany